The IBM 1627 was a rebranded Calcomp plotter sold by IBM for use with the IBM 1620, and, later, the IBM 1130 computers. It became perhaps the first non-IBM peripheral that IBM allowed to be attached to one of its computers.

The plotter fed a roll of paper with perforated edges over a drum with matching sprockets at the sides. The drum could move the paper forward and backward (the X-axis). A pen holder slid horizontally over the paper (the Y-axis). Both the drum and the pen holder were controlled by stepper motors. There were also commands to move the drum and pen together one step in the four diagonal directions.

Model 1 could operate at 18,000 steps per minute. Model 2 could operate at 12,000 steps per minute. 

A metal bar above the take-up reel allowed a finished plot to be torn off and removed. The drum would then be advanced using the manual controls and the fresh paper end taped to the take-up reel. The standard pen was a ball-point, but liquid ink pens were available, and typically used for higher quality plots intended for publication. Other paper stock could be taped to the drum if desired. A chart drive switch was provided to turn off the motorized paper supply and take-up reels for this purpose.

References
IBM 1627 documentation

External links
Photo of 1627 attached to an IBM 1620 at the Seattle World's Fair in 1962
Photo of Calcomp 565 plotter at Stuttgart Computer Museum
A working Calcomp 565 on Youtube.com

1627
1627